Henry Clerke was a physician.

Henry Clerke may also refer to:

Henry Clerke (MP for Rochester)
Henry Clerke (14th century MP), MP for Winchester (UK Parliament constituency)
Henry Clerke (MP died 1558), MP for Northampton (UK Parliament constituency)
Henry Clerke (MP for Bramber), in 1572, MP for Bramber (UK Parliament constituency)
Henry Clerke (MP died 1681) (1621–1681), MP for Great Bedwyn (UK Parliament constituency)

See also
Henry Clarke (disambiguation)
Henry Clark (disambiguation)